Cold Sweat is a 1970 French-Italian international co-production starring Charles Bronson and directed by Terence Young. It is based on the 1959 novel Ride the Nightmare by Richard Matheson. It was filmed in and around Beaulieu-sur-Mer.

Plot
An American (Charles Bronson) living in France must face his past when his wife and daughter are kidnapped by former fellow convicts turned narco-dealers he once double-crossed.

Cast

Production
The film was known for an extended car chase with an Opel Commodore GS/E I6 involving the Bronson character's attempt to get a doctor to a wounded drug dealer in exchange for his wife.

Actress Liv Ullmann complained in an interview that Charles Bronson was rude to her and her daughter during the filming. She claims that he returned her child to her when she wandered to his table and admonished her by saying "Please keep your child to yourself."

External links

References 

1970 films
1970s thriller films
1970s vigilante films
Films based on works by Richard Matheson
Films based on American novels
Films directed by Terence Young
French thriller films
Italian thriller films
Seafaring films
Films set in the Mediterranean Sea
Films set in France
Films set on the French Riviera
Films produced by Robert Dorfmann
French vigilante films
English-language French films
English-language Italian films
1970s exploitation films
1970s English-language films
1970s Italian films
1970s French films